Harald Philipp (1921–1999) was a German film director, screenwriter and actor.

Selected filmography
 The Old Forester House (1956)
 The Csardas King (1958)
 A Thousand Stars Aglitter (1959)
  (1960)
 Brandenburg Division (1960)
 Auf Wiedersehen (1961)
 Blind Justice (1961)
 The Oil Prince (1965)
 Manhattan Night of Murder (1965)
 The Trap Snaps Shut at Midnight (1966)
 Winnetou and the Crossbreed (1966)
 Love Nights in the Taiga (1967)
 Death Knocks Twice (1969)
 The Body in the Thames (1971)
  (1971)
 Der Fall Opa (1972, TV film)
 Ausbruch (1973, TV film)
 Sergeant Berry (1974–1975, TV series)
  (1975)
 Die Protokolle des Herrn M. (1979, TV series)
 Der Fuchs von Övelgönne (1981, TV series)
  (1982, TV series)

References

External links
 

1921 births
1999 deaths
Mass media people from Hamburg